This is a list of art schools in Quebec, Canada.

Music
Académie de musique du Québec
Conservatoire de musique et d'art dramatique du Québec

Cinema, TV and 2D/3D animation
Centre national d'animation et de design
Institut Desgraff
Institut national de l'image et du son
Mel Hoppenheim School of Cinema

Circus and street arts
École de cirque de Québec
École de Cirque de Verdun
École nationale de cirque
Les Forains Abyssaux

Theatre and dance
Conservatoire d'art dramatique de Montréal
Conservatoire Lassalle
École nationale de l'humour
École supérieure de ballet contemporain de Montréal
National Theatre School of Canada
Playwrights' Workshop Montreal

Visual arts
Atelier de Brésoles
Centre des arts visuels / Visual Arts Centre
Institut de création artistique et de recherche en infographie
Academy of Fine Arts of Quebec/ L’Académie des Beaux-Arts de Québec
Syn Studio École d’art / Art School

University
Concordia University Fine Arts Faculty
McGill University
Université de Montréal Faculté de Musique
Université du Québec à Montréal Faculté des Arts
Université Laval Faculté d'Aménagement, architecture et arts visuels

See also
Culture of Quebec
List of schools in Canada

Quebec
Art schools, List of Quebec
Quebec

Art schools